The 2016–17 FC Bayern Munich season was the 118th season in the football club's history and 52nd consecutive and overall season in the top flight of German football, the Bundesliga, having won promotion from the Regionalliga in 1965 after winning the Regionalliga Süd. Bayern Munich also participated in this season's edition of the domestic cup, the DFB-Pokal, and the premier continental cup competition, the UEFA Champions League. Bayern were the reigning Bundesliga and DFB-Pokal champions, and therefore also participated in the German super cup, the DFL-Supercup. It was the 12th season for Bayern in the Allianz Arena, located in Munich, Germany. The season covers a period from 11 July 2016 to 30 June 2017.

Review

Background
Bayern won the double in the previous season after winning a record-setting fourth consecutive and 25th overall Bundesliga title (26th German title) and 18th DFB-Pokal title. Manager Pep Guardiola did not extend his contract, and decided to move to Manchester City. Carlo Ancelotti was announced as his replacement in December 2015.

In addition, Bayern hired Paul Clement as their assistant coach. Hermann Gerland was also kept as an assistant coach, after also having been an assistant under Louis van Gaal, Jupp Heynckes, and Pep Guardiola. Toni Tapalović was retained as the goalkeeping coach, while Giovanni Mauri and Francesco Mauri were brought in as fitness coaches. In August, Carlo Aneclotti named his son Davide as assistant coach, joining Clement and Gerland.

Bayern signed Renato Sanches from Benfica and Mats Hummels from Borussia Dortmund on 10 May. Serdar Tasci returned to Spartak Moscow after his loan spell was finished. On 24 May, Pierre-Emile Højbjerg confirmed that he would be leaving Bayern, and on 11 July he transferred to Southampton. Patrick Weihrauch, who never made a senior appearance for Bayern, also left the club for Würzburger Kickers on 2 June. On 6 June, after making 17 appearances in all competitions during the 2015–16 season, Sebastian Rode left the club for Borussia Dortmund. Medhi Benatia was sent out on a season-long loan to Juventus, with the option to make it permanent for €17M. On 1 August, Mario Götze returned to Borussia Dortmund after three difficult seasons at the club. Goalkeeper Ivan Lučić signed for Bristol City on 27 July.

July
The new season officially began on 11 July 2016 with the presentation of Carlo Ancelotti as new manager and a training session. Jérôme Boateng, Manuel Neuer, Joshua Kimmich, Thomas Müller, Mats Hummels, Robert Lewandowski, Kingsley Coman, and Renato Sanches were all given an extended break until 5 August after UEFA Euro 2016.

On 23 July, Bayern played in their first pre-season friendly match against SV Lippstadt. The friendly was organised with Karl-Heinz Rummenigge's former club as part of a 60th birthday present for him. The match was meant to take place in October 2015, but was cancelled and rescheduled for July. Bayern won the match 4–3 after goals from Julian Green, Arjen Robben, and Franck Ribéry, along with a Lippstadt own goal. However, Robben suffered a hamstring injury, ruling him out for six weeks. On 20 July, Bayern faced Manchester City and former manager Pep Guardiola at home. Bayern won the match 1–0 after a goal from Erdal Öztürk in the 76th minute. Bayern's third pre-season friendly took place on 23 July against SpVgg Landshut. Bayern won 3–0 with goals from Franck Ribéry, David Alaba, and Daniel Hägler.

In March 2016, Bayern announced they would participate in a summer tour (referred to as the "2016 Audi Summer Tour") in the United States as part of the International Champions Cup, after success with their previous US visit in 2014. Bayern began their International Champions Cup campaign against Milan on 27 July in Chicago. Milan took the lead, but Bayern struck back with a goals from Ribéry and Alaba to give them the lead at half-time. In the second half, Milan retook the lead after scoring two goals. However, Bayern were awarded a penalty in the dying minutes, and Ribéry converted it to secure a 3–3 draw. The match would be decided on penalties, which Bayern lost 5–3 after Rafinha missed his spot kick. However, one point was still awarded for a loss on penalties. In their second match, Bayern faced Internazionale on 30 July in Charlotte. Bayern won the match 4–1 after a goal from Ribéry and a hat-trick from Green.

August
In their third match on 3 August, Bayern faced Real Madrid in East Rutherford. Bayern lost 1–0 after Danilo scored the winning goal in the 79th minute. Bayern finished 6th in the United States and Europe table.

Bayern returned to Munich on 4 August, and began final preparations for the new season. Their first competitive match was the DFL-Supercup away to Borussia Dortmund on 14 August. As Bayern completed the domestic double the previous season, Dortmund qualified as league runners-up. Bayern won the match 2–0 with second half goals from Arturo Vidal and Thomas Müller, after being outplayed in the opening 45 minutes.

In the first round of the DFB-Pokal, Bayern were drawn against fourth-division side Carl Zeiss Jena. The away match took place on 19 August. Bayern won 5–0 with a first half hat-trick from Lewandowski, and goals from Vidal and Hummels in the second period.

Bayern qualified automatically for the UEFA Champions League group stage after winning the Bundesliga the previous season. The draw for the group stage took place on 25 August, at the Grimaldi Forum in Monaco. Bayern were placed in Pot 1, and were drawn into Group D, along with Atlético Madrid, who knocked them out of the semi-finals in the previous season, PSV Eindhoven, and Rostov.

In late June, the DFL released the full Bundesliga schedule for the upcoming season. Bayern Munich were selected to face Werder Bremen at home in the season opener on 26 August. Bayern won the match 6–0, making it the biggest win by a defending champion to start the season. Xabi Alonso opened the scoring in the 9th minute, followed by Lewandowski four minutes later. Lewandowski then scored his second in the first minute of the second half, followed by goals from Philipp Lahm in the 66th minute and Ribéry in the 73rd. Lewandowski then completed his hat-trick in the 77th minute from the penalty spot. The win put Bayern in first following the matchday. Following the match, Bayern were drawn into a derby match against FC Augsburg at home for the second round of the DFB-Pokal, to take place on 26 October.

September
After the international break, Bayern faced Schalke 04, who were 15th in the table, for matchday 2 of the Bundesliga on 9 September. Bayern won the away match 2–0, sealing the win with two late goals. Lewandowski put Bayern ahead in the 81st minute, and Joshua Kimmich scored his first goal for the club in the second minute of stoppage time. The win kept Bayern at top of the table.

On 13 September, Bayern faced Russian side Rostov at home for the first Champions League fixture. Bayern won the match 5–0, with Lewandowski converting a penalty in the 28th minute before Müller scored on his birthday during second half stoppage time. Kimmich then scored a brace, with goals in the 53rd and 60th minutes. Juan Bernat then finished off the scoring with a goal in the 90th minute. With the win, Bayern finished top of Group D.

Bayern faced FC Ingolstadt, who were 16th in the table, at home on matchday 3 of the Bundesliga on 17 September. Bayern won the derby match 3–1, keeping them top of the table. Bayern went behind 8 minutes in after a goal from Darío Lezcano, but equalised four minutes later via a goal from Lewandowski. Alonso scored in the 50th minute to put Bayern in front, and Rafinha sealed the win with a goal in the 84th minute, his first since April 2013.

On 21 September, matchday 4 of the Bundesliga, Bayern played at home against Hertha BSC, who were second in the table and had a perfect record. Bayern won the match 3–0, putting them 2 points clear at the top of the table. Ribéry opened the scoring in the 16th minute, before Thiago extended Bayern's lead in the 68th minute. Robben, returning from injury, scored his first of the season in the 72nd minute after coming on as a substitute to wrap up the scoring.

Bayern met Hamburger SV on matchday 5 of the Bundesliga, taking place on 24 September. The match finished as a 1–0 win for Bayern, keeping them in first place in the league. The match was scoreless until the 88th minute, when Kimmich scored the lone goal, giving Bayern the late victory. The next day, Hamburg coach Bruno Labbadia was sacked after a winless start to the Bundesliga.

On 28 September, Bayern faced Spanish side Atlético Madrid away on matchday 2 in the Champions League. Bayern lost the match 0–1 for their first competitive loss of the season, putting them second in the group behind Atlético. Madrid opened the scoring in the 35th minute through Yannick Carrasco, deflecting off the post and in. Although having numerous opportunities, Bayern were unable to equalise, and in the 84th minute, Atlético were given a penalty after a poor challenge by Vidal on Filipe Luís. Antoine Griezmann missed the penalty, having hit the crossbar, but Atlético held on for the victory.

October
Bayern faced 1. FC Köln at home on 1 October, matchday 6 of the Bundesliga. The match finished as a 1–1 draw, their first dropped league points of the season, with Bayern staying 3 points clear at the top of the table. Kimmich opened the scoring for Bayern in the 40 minutes in, before Anthony Modeste equalised 63rd minute against the run of play. Bayern had numerous opportunities, but were unable to capitalise, making it two winless games in a row for the Bavarians.

After the international break, Bayern faced Eintracht Frankfurt away on 15 October, week 7 of the Bundesliga. The match finished as a 2–2 draw, their third consecutive winless match, but stayed first in the table with a 2-point lead. Robben opened the scoring for Bayern in the 10th minute, before Szabolcs Huszti equalised for Frankfurt right before half-time. Bayern once again went ahead after a goal from Kimmich in the 62nd minute, but Eintracht once again leveled the score, with a goal from Marco Fabián in the 78th minute securing the draw. During the match, reserve goalkeeper Tom Starke was sent off from the sidelines after a confrontation with Frankfurt players. However, he was not listed as a substitute despite being on the bench. The DFB Sports Court handed Starke a one match suspension, making him unavailable for selection against Borussia Mönchengladbach.

On 19 October, Bayern met Dutch side PSV Eindhoven at home on matchday 3 of the Champions League. Bayern won the match 4–1, staying second in the group standings. Müller opened the scoring in the 13th minute, before Kimmich added a second 8 minutes later. Luciano Narsingh got a goal back for Eindhoven to reduce the deficit to 2–1 going into half-time. In the 59th minute, Lewandowski put Bayern back to a two-goal lead, before Robben wrapped up the scoring in the 84th minute.

Bayern met Borussia Mönchengladbach at home on 22 October, matchday 8 of the Bundesliga. The match finished as a 2–0 win to Bayern, maintaining their 2-point lead at the top of the table. Vidal scored the first goal for Bayern in the 16th minute via a header. Fifteen minutes later, Douglas Costa extended Bayern's lead, which was enough for the win.

On 26 October, Bayern met FC Augsburg in round 2 of the DFB-Pokal. Bayern won the derby match 3–1, advancing to the round of 16. Lahm opened the scoring for Bayern only two minutes in, before Green doubled Bayern's lead four minutes before half-time. Only two minutes in the second half, Augsburg were awarded a penalty after Hummels knocked Gojko Kačar to the ground. Koo Ja-cheol had his penalty saved by Neuer, maintaining Bayern's two-goal advantage. Nine minutes later, Bayern were also awarded a penalty after a handball from Georg Teigl. However, Müller skied the ball over the crossbar. Augsburg then cut the deficit in the 68th minute via a goal from Ji Dong-won. In the third minute of stoppage time, Alaba scored Bayern's third goal and sealed the win. Following the match, Bayern were drawn against VfL Wolfsburg in the round of 16 of the DFB-Pokal, to take place on 7–8 February 2017 at home.

On 29 October, Bayern met FC Augsburg once again, this time away in week 9 of the Bundesliga. Bayern again won the derby match by the same scoreline of 3–1, keeping themselves first in the table by two points. Lewandowski opened the scoring in the 19th minute, before Robben doubled Bayern's advantage two minutes later. After two minutes into the second half, Lewandowski completed a brace, putting Bayern up by three. In the 67th minute, Koo Ja-cheol got a goal back for Augsburg, which ended up only as a consolation.

November
Bayern met PSV Eindhoven once again on 1 November, matchday 4 of the Champions League. Bayern won the match 2–1, keeping themselves second in the group standings. Santiago Arias opened the scoring for PSV with a possibly offside header past Neuer. However, the linesman did not see this, and the goal was given. In the 34th minute, Bayern were given the chance to equalise from the penalty spot after a handball from Andrés Guardado. Lewandowski scored the penalty to put Bayern level. The score remained level until the 73rd minute, when Lewandowski completed a brace with a goal following a cross from Alaba. With the win, Bayern qualified for the knockout phase of the Champions League, along with Atlético Madrid. The win also meant the elimination of PSV from the Champions League.

On 5 November, Bayern played 1899 Hoffenheim at home on matchday 10 of the Bundesliga. The match finished as a 1–1 draw, keeping Bayern at the top of the table based on goal difference. Kerem Demirbay opened the scoring for Hoffenheim in the 16th minute. Bayern equalised in the 34th minute via an own goal from Steven Zuber after a cross from Douglas Costa intended for Lewandowski. Both sides had chances in the second half, but the scores remained level.

Players

Squad

Transfers

In

Out

Friendly matches

Competitions

Overview

Bundesliga

League table

Results summary

Results by round

Matches

DFB-Pokal

DFL-Supercup

UEFA Champions League

Group stage

Knockout phase

Round of 16

Quarter-finals

Squad statistics

Appearances and goals

! colspan="13" style="background:#DCDCDC; text-align:center" | Players transferred out during the season
|-

|}

Goalscorers

Clean sheets

Disciplinary record

References

FC Bayern Munich seasons
Bayern Munich
Bayern Munich
German football championship-winning seasons